Chloroclystis decimana is a moth in the  family Geometridae. It is found in the Afrotropical realm.

References

Moths described in 1994
Chloroclystis
Moths of Africa